Lindsay Davenport and Mary Joe Fernández were the defending champions but did not compete that year.

Amanda Coetzer and Mary Pierce won in the final 6–3, 7–6 against Sung-Hee Park and Shi-Ting Wang.

Seeds
Champion seeds are indicated in bold text while text in italics indicates the round in which those seeds were eliminated. The top two seeded teams received byes into the quarterfinals.

 Rika Hiraki /  Nana Miyagi (semifinals)
 Rita Grande /  Kimberly Po (semifinals)
 Sung-Hee Park /  Shi-Ting Wang (final)
 Annabel Ellwood /  Kerry-Anne Guse (first round)

Draw

External links
 1996 Nichirei International Championships Doubles Draw

Nichirei International Championships
1996 WTA Tour